Acidic fibroblast growth factor intracellular-binding protein is a protein that in humans is encoded by the FIBP gene.

Function 

Acidic fibroblast growth factor is mitogenic for a variety of different cell types and acts by stimulating mitogenesis or inducing morphological changes and differentiation. The FIBP protein is an intracellular protein that binds selectively to acidic fibroblast growth factor (aFGF). It is postulated that FIBP may be involved in the mitogenic action of aFGF. Two transcript variants encoding different isoforms have been found for this gene.

Interactions 

FIBP has been shown to interact with FGF1.

References

Further reading